Max Herrmann-Neisse (also Max Hermann, 23 May 1886, Nysa – 8 April 1941, London) was a German expressionist writer.

He was a childhood friend of fellow writer Franz Jung. He was also a personal friend of the painter George Grosz, who portrayed him twice, in 1925 and 1927.

Following the German Revolution of 1918–1919 he was sympathiser with the Communist Workers Party of Germany (KAPD).

Biography 
Max Hermann was born in the city of Neisse in Silesia in to the family of an innkeeper. Since childhood, he suffered dwarfism. From 1905 to 1909 he studied literature at the Universities of Munich and Breslau, but did not complete the course, deciding to become a freelance writer. In 1911, his first publications appeared in Die Aktion, which went almost unnoticed by critics.

In 1914, he published his first collection of poetry, She and the City, for which ten years later he was awarded the Eichendorf Literary Prize. In 1916 he lost his parents. In 1917, he married his girlfriend Leni Gebek and moved to Berlin. During this time, he actively communicated with Berlin writers belonging to socialist and anarchist circles. At the same time, he adds the name of his hometown of Neisse to his surname.

In 1919 he published three collections of poems and a play Albine und Aujust. staged the same year, which were well received by critics from Else Lasker-Schüler and Oskar Loerke. He did not earn enough for a living so he also worked as a journalist and proofreader in publishing.

In the 1920s, he began to write short stories and other prose. In 1920 he published an autobiographical novel, Cajetan Schaltermann. While most of his texts were influenced by Expressionism, in 1925 his collection of short stories Die Begegnung shows his interest in the New Objectivity. He began to present his texts in cabarets and met Claire Waldoff and Alfred Polgar. He acquired fame in Berlin. Many artists, such as Otto Dix and George Grosz portrayed him. 

By the end of the 1920s, Hermann-Neisse became one of the most famous literary men in Berlin; in 1927 he was awarded the prestigious Gerhart Hauptmann Prize. 

In 1933, shortly after the Nazis came to power and the burning of the Reichstag, the poet decided to emigrate. He left for Switzerland, and then, through several European countries, moved to London. All this time, one of the wealthy connoisseurs of his work had been providing material assistance to Herman-Neisse. In 1936, he founded the PEN Center for German Writers in Exile in London, but found no support and remained practically isolated. He was deprived of German citizenship by the Nazis, and his works were not translated into English, despite repeated requests. The poems of this period of his work became classics of German émigré poetry.

In April 1941 he died of a heart attack in London and was buried in East Finchley Cemetery in London. His last poems were posthumously published by his wife Leni, who in 1960 committed suicide. Like many writers of the time, Max Herrmann-Neisse was quickly forgotten. It was not until the late 1970s that his works were gradually rediscovered and reissued.

Works
 Ein kleines Leben. Gedichte und Skizzen. 1906
 Das Buch Franziskus. 1911
 Porträte des Provinztheaters. Sonette. 1913
 Sie und die Stadt. 1914
 Empörung, Andacht, Ewigkeit. Gedichte. 1918
 Verbannung. Ein Buch Gedichte. 1919
 Die Preisgabe. Gedichte. 1919
 Joseph der Sieger. Drei Bilder. 1919 (later retitled Albine und Aujust)
 Die Laube der Seligen. Eine komische Tragödie. 1919
 Cajetan Schaltermann. 1920
 Hilflose Augen. Prosadichtungen. 1920
 Der Flüchtling. 1920
 Der letzte Mensch. Eine Komödie vor Weltuntergang. 1922
 Die bürgerliche Literaturgeschichte und das Proletariat (Bourgeois Literary History and the Proletariat) Berlin-Wilmersdorf: Verlag Die Aktion. 1922
 Im Stern des Schmerzes. Ein Gedichtbuch. 1924
 Die Begegnung. Vier Erzählungen. 1925
 Der Todeskandidat. Erzählung. 1927
 Einsame Stimme. Ein Buch Gedichte. 1927
 Abschied. Gedichte. 1928
 Musik der Nacht. Gedichte. 1932
 Ein deutscher Dichter bin ich einst gewesen. Gedichte. 1934
 Um uns die Fremde. Gedichte. 1936
 Letzte Gedichte, herausgegeben von Leni Herrmann. 1941

References

1886 births
1941 deaths
German Expressionist writers
People from Silesia
20th-century German male writers
20th-century German poets
Emigrants from Nazi Germany to the United Kingdom
German emigrants to the United Kingdom
20th-century German dramatists and playwrights